Thomas Ryan (4 May 1865 – 20 April 1921) was an Australian cricketer. He played two first-class matches for Tasmania between 1888 and 1890.

See also
 List of Tasmanian representative cricketers

References

External links
 

1865 births
1921 deaths
Australian cricketers
Tasmania cricketers
Cricketers from Hobart